Pudozhsky (masculine), Pudozhskaya (feminine), or Pudozhskoye (neuter) may refer to:
Pudozhsky District, a district of the Republic of Karelia, Russia
Pudozhskoye Urban Settlement, a municipal formation which the town of Pudozh and eleven rural localities in Pudozhsky District of the Republic of Karelia, Russia are incorporated as
Pudozhsky mine, a titanium mine in the Republic of Karelia, Russia